In military terms, 122nd Division or 122nd Infantry Division may refer to:

122nd Infantry Division (Wehrmacht)
122nd Guards Rifle Division (Soviet Union)
122nd Division (Imperial Japanese Army)
122nd Division (People's Republic of China)